Manoe Mathilda Catharina Maria Meulen (born 11 September 1978) is a retired Dutch football defender. After making her national team debut in April 2003, she represented the senior Netherlands women's national football team on 55 occasions, scoring one goal. Meulen played in all five matches as the Netherlands reached the semi-final of UEFA Women's Euro 2009.

International goals
Scores and results list the Netherlands goal tally first.

References

External links
Meulen profile on women's Netherlands
Meulen profile on UEFA.com

1978 births
Living people
Dutch women's footballers
Netherlands women's international footballers
Eredivisie (women) players
Sportspeople from Weert
Willem II (women) players
VVV-Venlo (women) players
Women's association football defenders
Footballers from Limburg (Netherlands)